Colorado State Highway 5 (SH 5) is a  state highway in the U.S. state of Colorado that is the highest paved road in North America with its upper terminus at  elevation near the summit of Mount Evans and its lower terminus at  elevation at  near Echo Lake.

Route description
It passes through the Mount Evans Wilderness. This particular state highway is quite unusual in that it does not pass through any cities, towns, or unincorporated communities.

The route is entirely contained within Clear Creek County.

Because of its mountainous route, SH 5 is closed seasonally when snow clearance becomes excessively difficult, usually from Labor Day to Memorial Day. During the warmer months the road is open 24 hours a day. A toll (or "park fee") is charged, though technically the toll is only necessary for the use of the parking lot at the summit between 8 A.M. and 6:30 P.M. As a state highway, the road is open to the public and free to traverse out and back.

History
SH 5's current routing up to Mount Evans was originally a part of SH 103; however, it was renumbered as SH 5 by year 1955.

Major intersections

References

External links

005
Transportation in Clear Creek County, Colorado